Gerran is a male given name. Notable people with this name include:

 Gerran Howell (born 1991), Welsh actor, director, and short film writer
 Gerran Walker (born 1983), American football player

See also
 Gerrans

Masculine given names